

Regular season

Relegation playoffs

Leche Río Breogán and Pamesa Valencia, relegated to Liga EBA.

Championship Playoffs

See also
 Liga ACB

External links
 ACB.com 
 linguasport.com 

Liga ACB seasons
  
Spain